Jingha may refer to:

Jingha Expressway, expressway in China that links Beijing to Harbin
Jingha railway, railway in China that connects Beijing with Harbin